Alice Marie Céleste Durand ( Fleury; 12 October 1842 in Paris – 26 May 1902) was a French writer best known under her pen name Henry Gréville. 

The daughter of a professor, she accompanied her father to St. Petersburg, studied languages and science and married Émile Durand, a French law professor at Petersburg, with whom she returned to France in 1872.

Gréville had already published novels in St. Petersburg journals: A travers des champs and Sonia, and continued her production in France, first with the novels Dosia (1876) and L'Expiation de Savéli (1876), depicting Russian society. Her first full novel Dosia was awarded the Montyon Prize and saw many editions. Her books were translated in many European languages.

Works 
 A travers des champs
 Sonia
 La Fille de Dosia (1876)
 L'Expiation de Savéli (1876)
 La Princesse Oghérof (1876)
 Les Koumiassine (1877)
 Suzanne Normis (1877)
 La Maison de Maurèze (1877)
 Les Épreuves de Raïssa (1877)
 L'Amie (1878)
 Un violon russe (1879)
 Lucie Rodey (1879)
 Le Moulin Frappier (1880)
 La cité Ménard (1880)
 L'Héritage de Xénie (1880); Published in German as Erbschaft Xenias in Engelhorn's allgemeine Roman-Bibliothek series (1888)
 Madame de Dreux (1881)
 Rose Rozier (1872)
 Un crime (1884)
 
 Idylle.... (1885)
 Cléopâtre (1886)
 Zitka or the Trials of Raissa no date stamp on the paperback from Royal Publishing Company.
 Aurette (1891)

References

External links
 
 
   
 

1842 births
1902 deaths
Writers from Paris
French women novelists
19th-century male writers
19th-century French women writers